Hutch may refer to:

Places
 Hutch, Kentucky, an unincorporated community located in Bell County, Kentucky, United States
 Hutchinson, Kansas ("Hutch"), a city in Kansas, United States
 Hutchinson, Minnesota ("Hutch"), a city in Minnesota, United States
 Hutchinson River Parkway ("The Hutch"), in Bronx and Westchester Counties, New York State, United States
 The Hutch or Fred Hutch, that is, the Fred Hutchinson Cancer Research Center in Seattle, Washington, United States

People
 Hutch Dano (born 1992), American actor
 Hutch Harris, American singer-songwriter for The Thermals
 Michael Hutchence (1960–1997), vocalist for INXS
 Ken Hutcherson (born 1952), former National Football League linebacker, pastor of Antioch Bible Church in Kirkland, Washington
 James Hutchison (American politician) (born c. 1942),  American politician
 James Hutchinson (musician) (born 1953), American bassist
 Leslie Hutchinson (1900–1969), popular singer of the 1930s known as "Hutch"
 Shaun Hutchinson (born 1990), Football player in the Scottish Premier League
 Hutch Jones (born 1959), American former basketball player
 Hutch Maiava (born 1976), rugby league player
 Jesse Hutch (born 1981), actor

Fictional characters
 Kenneth "Hutch" Hutchinson, one of the two main characters in the television series Starsky and Hutch
 Hutch (fictional character), in the film Wallace & Gromit: The Curse of the Were-Rabbit
 Honeybee Hutch, in the anime The Adventures of Hutch the Honeybee and the film Hutch the Honeybee
 Edward "Hutch" Hutchins  Rosemary's friend in the novel and film Rosemary's Baby

Companies
 Hutch BMX, a bicycle manufacturer
 Hutch (Sri Lanka), a mobile network in Sri Lanka
 Hutch Essar, a cellular phone service provider in India, since renamed Vodafone Essar

Other uses
 Hutch (animal cage), a type of cage utilized primarily for housing domestic rabbits
 Hutch (furniture), a form of furniture
 Hutch (synchrotron), a radiation shielding enclosure in a synchrotron radiation beamline
 The Hutch, a 2013 album by Steak Number Eight
 Hutch, a trough, used in ore dressing
 Mine hutch
 "Hutch", a song by Big Red Machine from the album How Long Do You Think It's Gonna Last?

See also
 Hutchinson (disambiguation)
 Hutchison (disambiguation)